Anatoly Aleksandrovich Vlasov (– 22 December 1975) was a Russian, later Soviet, theoretical physicist prominent in the fields of statistical mechanics, kinetics, and especially in plasma physics.

Biography
Anatoly Vlasov was born in Balashov, in the family of a steamfitter. In 1927 he entered into the Moscow State University (MSU) and graduated from the MSU in 1931. After the graduation Vlasov continued to work in the MSU, where he spent all his life, collaborating with Nobelists Pyotr Kapitsa, Lev Landau, and other leading physicists. He became a full Professor at the Moscow State University in 1944 and was the head of the theoretical physics department in the Faculty of Physics at Moscow State University from 1945 to 1953. He was a member of Communist Party of USSR since 1944

In 1970 he received the Lenin Prize.

Research
His main works are in optics, plasma physics, physics of crystals, theory of gravitation, and statistical physics.

Optics
In optics he analyzed, partially with Vasily Fursov, spectral line broadening in gases at large densities (1936—1938). A new suggestion in these works was to use long range collective interactions between atoms for a correct description of spectra line broadening at large densities.

Plasma physics
Vlasov became world-famous for his work on plasma physics (1938) (see also ). He showed that the Boltzmann equation is not suitable for a description of plasma dynamics due to the existence of long range collective forces in the plasma. Instead, an equation known now as the Vlasov equation was suggested for the correct description to take into account the long range collective forces through a self-consistent field. The field is determined by taking moments of the distribution function described in Vlasov's equation to compute both the charge density and current density. Coupled with Maxwell's equations, the resulting system of differential equations are well-posed provided correct initial conditions and boundary conditions are provided.

The Vlasov equation, which is related to the Liouville's equation and the collisionless Boltzmann equation, is fundamental to plasma physics. In 1945, Vlasov showed that this equation, with the collective interaction taken into account, can explain without any additional hypotheses and specifications such effects as the presence and spontaneous origin of eigenfrequencies in polyatomic systems, the spontaneous origin of crystal structure from a "gas" medium, and the presence and spontaneous origin of currents in the media due to the collective interaction of the particles.

Physics of crystals
In this subject Vlasov in particular studied using the linearized Vlasov equation the conditions for spontaneous origin of crystal structure in the medium and found the criteria for the origin of the periodic structure in terms of the temperature, density, and microscopic interaction of particles of the medium.

See also
Vlasov equation

Selected publications
A. A. Vlasov (1961). Many-Particle Theory and Its Application to Plasma. New York, Gordon and Breach. ; .
A. A. Vlasov (1966). Statistical Distribution Functions [in Russian]. Nauka.
A. A. Vlasov (1978). Nonlocal Statistical Mechanics [in Russian]. Nauka, Moscow.

References

External links 
Anatolii Aleksandrovich Vlasov (obituary) (in English), I. P. Bazarov et al., Soviet Physics Uspekhi 19, 545—546 (1976).
Anatoly Vlasov in the Great Soviet Encyclopedia 
Anatoly Vlasov in the All-Russia Genealogical Tree 

1908 births
1975 deaths
20th-century Russian physicists
People from Balashov
Moscow State University alumni
Academic staff of Moscow State University
Lenin Prize winners
Recipients of the Order of the Red Banner of Labour
Plasma physicists
Theoretical physicists
Russian physicists
Soviet physicists
Burials at Donskoye Cemetery